The 1976 Montana State Bobcats football team represented the Montana State University in the 1976 NCAA Division II football season. The team was led by sixth-year head coach Sonny Holland and won the Division II national championship. The Bobcats played their home games on campus in Bozeman at Reno H. Sales Stadium.

Entering August practices, the Bobcats were expected to finish in the middle of the conference standings. Led on the field by southpaw sophomore quarterback Paul Dennehy, Montana State went undefeated in the Big Sky and against all Division II opponents, falling only to Fresno State of Division I. Montana State finished their schedule with a 28–7 victory at Hawaii to end the regular season at 9–1.

Division II playoffs
In the Division II playoffs, the Bobcats hosted New Hampshire in Bozeman in the quarterfinals and won by a point, 17–16. In the semifinals at Fargo, MSU defeated North Dakota State for a second time in 1976, by a much closer 10–3 score in the Grantland Rice Bowl.

In the Pioneer Bowl for the Division II title in Wichita Falls, Texas, the Bobcats defeated Akron 24–13 and became the first Big Sky team to win a national title in football. the Bobcats went undefeated in the Big Sky and won the Division II national championship.

Schedule

References

Montana State
Montana State Bobcats football seasons
NCAA Division II Football Champions
Big Sky Conference football champion seasons
Grantland Rice Bowl champion seasons
Montana State Bobcats football